This is a list of seasons completed by the Central Missouri Mules basketball team.

Note that Central Missouri uses the nickname "Mules" exclusively for men's sports. Women's athletes and teams are known as "Jennies".

References

 
Central Missouri Mules
Central Missouri Mules basketball seasons